Andrzej Walter (born December 29, 1969, in Zabrze) is a Polish poet, writer, critic, and photographer.

Biography 
His parents came from Lemberg and he was born in Zabrze and lives in Gliwice. There he was at high school from 1984 to 1988, studied at University of Economics in Katowice, works in a Polish-American Bank and owns a tax office with his wife Jadwiga.

Literature 
He has published seven poetry books and critical texts and lyrics in a variety of anthologies. Since 2011 he is a member of the Polish Writers' Union in Krakow.

Photography 
Walter graduated from the New York Institute of Photography. In 2001 he won first prize in a contest of the publishing house Serbin Communications and was the winner of a contest of the magazine Photographers Forum (US). His work is listed in the catalogue of B&W Magazine.

Works

Bibliography 
 Miłość Wydawnictwo Fineko, 2007. 
 Tam gdzie zebrałem poziomki Towarzystwo Słowaków w Polsce, 2010. 
 Punkt rzeczy znalezionych Towarzystwo Słowaków w Polsce, 2011. 
 Śmierć bogów Towarzystwo Słowaków/Association of Slovaks in Poland, 2012. 
 Pesel Wydawnictwo Pisarze.pl, 2013. 
 Niepokój horyzontu. Wiersze wybrane/selected poems 2002–2014 Wydawnictwo Adam Marszałek 2014. 
 Czas zbierania kamieni, critics, Agencja ATM, 2017. 
 Ciężar właściwy Wydawnictwo Adam Marszałek 2017.

Exhibitions 
 Santoryn – Gliwice (2002)
 Jest taka Europa – Dom Współpracy Polsko-Niemieckiej/House of German-Polish Culture Gliwice (2002)
 Barwne Impresje – Galeria ArtDekor in Stavanger, Norway (2004)
 Nastroje – Bookfair Krakau (2004)
 Salon Artystyczny Krakowa – Piwnica pod Baranami, Krakow (2004)
 Miłość – Warszawa, Wrocław, Gliwice, Rybnik, Katowice, Kielce (2007–2010)
 Zamyślenia – Galeria Perkoz in Gliwice (2010)
 Fotografie nieudane –  Gliwice, Rybnik (2014)
 Błękitno-biało – Gliwice, Katowice, Rybnik, Jastrzębie-Zdrój (2014–2017)
 Kolory Grecji –  Śrem, Rybnik (2017)
 Wszystkie drogi poetów prowadzą do Poznania – Poznań (2017)

References

External links 
 Andrzej Walter – official website

Polish poets
People from Gliwice
Living people
1969 births
Polish male poets